George Samuel Elgood (1851–1943) was an English artist and illustrator who became well known for his paintings of formal gardens.

Elgood was born in Leicester, Leicestershire, one of a family of 7 boys and 2 girls. After a private education at various schools, including Bloxham, he studied art at Leicester Art School under Wilmot Pilsbury, and then architectural drawing at the South Kensington Schools in London.

Elgood's father died in 1874 necessitating a return home to look after the family business, although he continued to paint part-time. He went on painting expeditions and holidays with his art school tutor Pilsbury, and had some lessons from local artist John Fulleylove who was his brother-in-law, as well as travelling and painting with his wife, Mary Wellington Clephan, who was also an artist.

In the early 1880s, he was free to resume art full-time, becoming a member of the Royal Institute of Painters in Water Colours (RI) in 1882 and the Royal Institute of Oil Painters (ROI) a few years later. He exhibited several times at the Fine Art Society between 1890–1925.

Elgood became known mainly as a painter of historic gardens, travelling throughout England, France, Spain and Italy in the course of his professional life. Many of his pictures were used to illustrate Some English Gardens (1904) by the famous garden designer Gertrude Jekyll and Italian Gardens (1907) which Elgood wrote himself.

In 1908 he settled in an old 16th-century timbered house called "Knockwood" in Tenterden, Kent, where he designed and constructed his own formal garden in the grounds. He also designed and had constructed a farmhouse (in a vernacular style) and two local war memorials.

Notes

Bibliography
Illustrated by Elgood:
Gertrude Jekyll. Some English gardens (Longmans, Green & Co., 1904).
Elgood, George S. Italian Gardens (Longmans, Green and Co., 1907)

About Elgood
Eckstein, Eve. George Samuel Elgood: His Life and Work (Alpine Fine Arts Collection, 1994).

External links

 
2 Works by Elgood (Art Renewal Center Museum)
Foxglove and cottage garden, Ramcliffe (Christie's)
Roses and Pinks at Levens Hall, Kendal, Cumbria (Christie's)
Digitised works by George Samuel Elgood at Biodiversity Heritage Library

19th-century English painters
English male painters
20th-century English painters
English illustrators
English landscape painters
English watercolourists
1943 deaths
1851 births
People educated at Bloxham School
People from Leicester
Alumni of the Royal College of Art
20th-century English male artists
19th-century English male artists